George Gooma (25 June 1918 – 1 October 1985) was an Australian cricketer. He played in two first-class matches for Queensland in 1939/40.

See also
 List of Queensland first-class cricketers

References

External links
 

1918 births
1985 deaths
Australian cricketers
Queensland cricketers
Cricketers from Brisbane